Klaudio Rexhepi (born 24 May 1989 in Ersekë) is an Albanian professional footballer who plays as a defender for Albanian First Division club Turbina Cërrik.

Club career
Rexhepi scored his first-career goal on 28 April 2012 while representing FK Kukësi, scoring the third goal of his team in an eventual 3–4 away win against Besëlidhja Lezhë.

On 1 August 2012, he signed with Dinamo Tirana for an undisclosed fee, leaving Kukësi after just one season. He was also the target of Tërbuni Pukë.

Honours

Club
FK Kukësi

Albanian First Division: Runner-up 2011–12

References

External links

1989 births
Living people
People from Ersekë
Albanian footballers
Association football defenders
KS Gramozi Ersekë players
FK Kukësi players
FK Dinamo Tirana players
KS Egnatia Rrogozhinë players
KS Turbina Cërrik players
Kategoria Superiore players
Kategoria e Parë players